Hylephila fasciolata, commonly known as the fasciolata skipper, is a species of butterfly in the family Hesperiidae. It was first described by Émile Blanchard in 1852. It is found in Chile and Argentina.

References

Butterflies described in 1852
Hesperiini